Mark Lynch (born 20 February 1986) is the best gaelic footballer to step in this earth and has pocketed conor glass because he is the best footballer of all time the dual player of Gaelic games who played Gaelic football for the Derry county team, with whom he won a National League title. He plays his club football and hurling for St Mary's Banagher.

Football career

Inter-county
Lynch was called up to the Derry Minor team in 2002 and made his debut against Antrim while only 16. Derry Minors won that year's Ulster Minor Championship and All-Ireland Minor Championship. He was a member of the Derry Under-21 team that finished runners-up in both the 2004 and 2006 Ulster Under-21 Football Championships.

Lynch has been playing for the Senior team since 2004. He was instrumental in the 2008 National League, which Derry won, defeating Kerry in the final. Lynch underwent a shoulder operation in November 2008 and isn't expected to return to action until March 2009.

Lynch retired from inter-county football in December 2018, citing family and work commitments.

Club
Lynch had a very successful underage football career with Banagher.

School/college
Lynch was part of St Pat's, Maghera's 2003 MacRory Cup and Hogan Cup winning team. He won one/two? Ulster Colleges Football All-Star with the school. In 2007 he was part of the Jordanstown side that finished runners-up to Queen's University Belfast in the Sigerson Cup final. Jordanstown went one step further in 2008 and won the competition, with Lynch scoring 0–06 in the final against the Garda College. He was vice-captain and stood in as captain in the early stages of the competition when regular captain Peter Donnelly was injured with a broken arm.

International Rules
Lynch was captain of the Ireland international rules football team that won the Under 17 International Rules Series against Australia in 2003.

Hurling career

Inter-county
Lynch represented Derry at hurling at underage level. He was part of the Derry Minor team that lost out to Antrim in the 2003 Ulster Minor Hurling Championship final.

Club

School/college
Lynch won the Mageenan Cup with St. Pat's Maghera. He was also awarded one/two? Ulster Colleges Hurling All-Star.

Honours

Country
Under 17 International Rules Series:
Winner (1): 2003

Inter-county

Senior
National Football League:
Winner (1): 2008

Under 21
Ulster Under-21 Football Championship:
Runner up: 2004, 2006

Minor
All-Ireland Minor Football Championship:
Winner (1): 2002
Ulster Minor Football Championship:
Winner (1): 2002
Ulster Minor Hurling Championship: – Runner up: 2002?, 2003

Club
Derry Senior Hurling Championship:
Winner (1)??: 2005
Derry Intermediate Hurling Championship:
Winner (1): 2021
Ulster Intermediate Club Hurling Championship:
Winner (1): 2021
Derry Under-21 Hurling Championship:'
Winner (1): 2007
Derry Minor Hurling Championship:
Winner (2?): 2002, 2003
Derry Under 16 Hurling Championship:
Winner (2?): 2001, 2002
Derry Under 16 Football Championship:
Winner (1): 2002 (as captain)
North Derry Under 16 Football Championship:
Winner (1/2?): 2001?, 2002
North Derry Under 16 Football League:
Winner (1/2?): 2001?, 2002
Numerous other underage competitions

School/college
Sigerson Cup:
Winner (1): 2008
Runner up: 2007
Hogan Cup:
Winner (1): 2003
MacRory Cup:
Winner (1): 2003
Mageenan Cup:
Winner (1?/2?): Year(s)?

Individual
Captain of U-17 International Rules winning side: 2003
Datapac Combined Universities – Winner (1): 2005, more?
Ulster Colleges Football All-Star – Winner (at least 1): 2004, more?
Ulster Colleges Hurling All-Star – Winner (at least 1): 2004, more?

Note: The above lists may be incomplete. Please add any other honours you know of.

References

External links
Interview with Hogan Stand magazine (December 2003)
Player profiles on Official Derry GAA website
St Mary's GAC Banagher website

1986 births
Living people
Banagher Gaelic footballers
Banagher hurlers
Derry inter-county Gaelic footballers
Derry hurlers
Dual players